Roots of Knowledge is a permanent stained glass display completed in 2016 at Utah Valley University (UVU) in Orem, Utah, United States. The creation of the exhibit was designed and overseen by stained glass artists Tom Holdman and Cameron Oscarson. It took over 12 years and cost US$4.5 million to complete.

Description
The Roots of Knowledge is a permanent stained glass exhibit in the Ira A. and Mary Lou Fulton Library at Utah Valley University in Orem, Utah in the United States. Each of the panels was handcrafted from over 43,000 pieces of glass depicting part of the progress of human knowledge during recorded history. The exhibit depicts both religious and secular events and objects.

In addition to the stained, blown, fused, and carved glass used for most of the window, other objects were incorporated into the display. These included a shark's tooth, part of the Berlin Wall, a Purple Heart medal, a $5 bill from 1777, and glass from NASA. Part of the window incorporates a replication of the oldest stained glass known: a window created in 647 AD at The Abbey Church of Saint Peter and Saint Paul, Monkwearmouth–Jarrow in England.

History
The idea to create the stained glass exhibit began in 2004. For the next 12 years, Holdman and Oscarson worked to design and create the 80 panels included in the final exhibit. Each panel was handcrafted by the original designers, Tom Holdman and Cameron Oscarson, who worked with over 350 student artists, 26 faculty members, and 40 other artists during the construction of the exhibit.

The US$4.5 million project was funded through private donations, including through  sponsorships of individual pieces of glass. It was officially unveiled on November 18, 2016, as part of the 75th anniversary of the university.

Reception
The installation was described as a "tour de force" by the curator of ceramics and glass at the Victoria and Albert Museum in London. The windows have been compared to those in several European cathedrals, including the Cologne Cathedral in Germany, Sainte-Chapelle in France, and York Minster in England. The Utah Education Network worked with Holdman and UVU to create curriculum and field trips based on the project. 

The project is the subject of a one-hour documentary created for PBS by Lee Groberg.

References

2016 works
Stained glass
Monuments and memorials in Utah
Utah Valley University
Tourist attractions in Utah County, Utah